Mindy Escobar-Leanse is a puppeteer.

References

1988 births
American puppeteers
American Academy of Dramatic Arts alumni
Living people
Place of birth missing (living people)
21st-century American people